Suzana Tratnik is a Slovenian writer, translator, activist, and sociologist. She has published seven short-story collections, four novels, a play, a children’s picture book, two works of nonfiction, and an essay collection. Her books and short stories have been translated into more than twenty languages while Tratnik herself has translated several English books into Slovene, including works from authors such as Jackie Kay, Leslie Feinberg, Judith Butler, Adrienne Rich, Ian McEwan, and Truman Capote.

In 2007 Tratnik was awarded the Prešeren Foundation Prize, one of Slovenia’s most prestigious literary awards. Her most recent work, Games with Greta and Other Stories, is forthcoming in translation from Dalkey Archive Press.

Life

Suzana Tratnik was born in 1963 in Murska Sobota, in Slovenia. She obtained her BA in sociology from the Faculty of Social Sciences at the University of Ljubljana, and her MA in gender anthropology from the Institutum Studiorum Humanitatis in Ljubljana, where she lives and works. Tratnik was deeply involved in the 1980s LGBT-rights movement in Yugoslavia and much of work continues to focus upon LGBT activism and scholarship in contemporary Slovenia.

Works 

Short Stories

Pod ničlo (Below Zero, 1997)
Na svojem dvorišču (In One’s Own Backyard, 2003)
Vzporednice (Parallels, 2005)
Česa nisem nikoli razumela na vlaku (Things I’ve Never Understood on the Train, 2008)
Dva svetova (Two Worlds, 2010)
Rezervat (Reservation, 2012)Games with Greta and Other Stories (2016. Dalkey Archive Press)

NovelsIme mi je Damjan (My Name is Damjan, 2001)Tretji svet (Third World, 2007)

Children'sZafuškana Ganca (The Hany Rattie, 2010)

DramaIme mi je Damjan (My Name is Damjan, 2002)Lep dan še naprej'' (Have a Nice Day, 2012)

Books of Suzana Tratnik in translation 

Short Stories

References

1963 births
Slovenian novelists
21st-century novelists
21st-century Slovenian writers
Living people